Charles Edmund Rumbold (11 August 1788 – 31 May 1857) was a British Whig politician.

He was the fifth son of Sir Thomas Rumbold, 1st Baronet, and his second wife Joanna Law, daughter of Edmund Law, Bishop of Carlisle. Rumbold was educated at Oriel College, Oxford, and went then to Trinity College, Cambridge. In 1812, he began his Grand Tour and returned a year later.

Rumbold was elected as Member of Parliament (MP) for Great Yarmouth in 1818, a seat he held until 1835. In the general election of 1837 he returned to the House of Commons and sat for the constituency again until 1847. In a by-election in the following year, he stood successfully a third time for Great Yarmouth and represented it until his death in 1857.

In 1834, he married Harriet, daughter of John Gardner, and had by her three sons. He died at Brighton, aged 68, and was buried at Preston Candover in Hampshire.

References

External links

1788 births
1857 deaths
Burials in Hampshire
Alumni of Oriel College, Oxford
Alumni of Trinity College, Cambridge
Whig (British political party) MPs for English constituencies
Members of the Parliament of the United Kingdom for English constituencies
UK MPs 1818–1820
UK MPs 1820–1826
UK MPs 1826–1830
UK MPs 1830–1831
UK MPs 1831–1832
UK MPs 1832–1835
UK MPs 1837–1841
UK MPs 1841–1847
UK MPs 1847–1852
UK MPs 1852–1857
Younger sons of baronets
People from Great Yarmouth
Committee members of the Society for the Diffusion of Useful Knowledge